Scott Nicolaus Driscoll (born 16 April 1975) is a former Australian politician, national peak industry association president, company director and a businessman. He was a member of the Legislative Assembly of Queensland from March 2012 until November 2013, holding the seat of Redcliffe. He was also Executive Director and then elected National President of peak national industry association, the United Retail Federation.

Industry association leadership
Driscoll was executive director and then elected president of the United Retail Federation. He oversaw the rebranding of organisation and expanded its membership footprint and political influence beyond Queensland and onto a national level.

Political career
Driscoll was elected to the Legislative Assembly at the 2012 state election representing the Liberal National Party of Queensland in the Brisbane-area seat of Redcliffe. He defeated Labor incumbent Lillian van Litsenburg with a swing of 15.67%, turning the previously marginal seat into a safe LNP seat.

Driscoll was the subject of complaints to the Crime and Misconduct Commission in November 2012, followed by complaints of fraud to the Queensland Police. Though after thorough and extended CMC and Queensland Police investigations resulting in no grounds being found to justify any charges in this regard, it was alleged by Driscoll's rivals that he secretly controlled the taxpayer-funded Moreton Bay Regional Community Association and had funnelled $2600 in consultancy fees each week to his wife. It was also claimed that he used his electorate office to continue his work with the Queensland Retail Traders and Shopkeepers Association, and that his wife had a contract with the retailers' body worth $350,000 a year.  Although Premier Campbell Newman initially stood by Driscoll, he personally recommended that Driscoll be suspended from the LNP after concluding his failure to provide a "fulsome and precise" explanation of the affair had become a distraction.

On 25 March 2013, he was suspended from the LNP. After the LNP executive initiated proceedings to have him expelled from the party, Driscoll resigned from the party the following month and subsequently sat as an independent.

His home was raided by the CMC in May 2013. Driscoll's wife was charged with fraud and perjury as a result of the investigation.

The misconduct allegations were referred to the Queensland Parliament Ethics Committee in June 2013.

On 19 November 2013, Driscoll was found guilty of 42 counts of contempt of Parliament, four counts of failing to register interests and one count of misleading the House. The Ethics Committee recommended that:
 he be fined $84,000 for contempt;
 he be fined $4,000 for failing to register interests;
 he be fined $2,000 for misleading the House; and
 the Legislative Assembly move to expel Driscoll from the chamber and declare the seat of Redcliffe vacant "to protect the honour and dignity of the Legislative Authority".

The final report found that nothing short of expulsion was appropriate because Driscoll had, by his actions, "brought odium on the Legislative Assembly as an institution" and had demonstrated "a want of honesty and probity not fitting a Member of the House". Newman said that Driscoll had committed a "breathtaking, staggering deception on this house and the people of Queensland".

Driscoll resigned from Parliament later that day, citing health reasons. However, both major parties had indicated they would support an expulsion motion, making it all but certain that Driscoll would be ejected from the chamber.

On 21 November 2013, Driscoll was summoned to the Bar of the House to explain his actions.  His solicitor, Peter Russo, spoke on his behalf and acknowledged that Driscoll had made errors in judgement, but would have corrected his interests register and the record if not for his ill health (Driscoll announced he suffered from bipolar disorder).  He asked that the fine be reduced to $12,000.  The Assembly was unmoved, and voted to fine him the recommended $90,000. The fine was paid in full the following day. The resulting 2014 Redcliffe by-election saw Labor reclaim the seat on a large swing.

On 25 November 2016, Driscoll pleaded guilty on 15 fraud charges. Driscoll, falsified meeting minutes of the Queensland Retail Traders and Shopkeepers Association and took secret commissions while with the group. On 10 March 2017, Driscoll was convicted to serve at least 18 months in prison after being sentenced to six years' jail for fraud. He will be eligible for parole on 6 September 2018.

Unsubstantiated intimidation claims by rival
Bruce Mills, a former associate, made the unsubstantiated claim he was intimidated by Driscoll, and that he attempted suicide, after Mills was charged with creating false meeting minutes and was also under media scrutiny and police investigation for his own financial mismanagement of a local community association.

References

Living people
Australian monarchists
Australian chief executives
Independent members of the Parliament of Queensland
Liberal National Party of Queensland politicians
Members of the Queensland Legislative Assembly
Australian politicians convicted of crimes
1975 births
21st-century Australian politicians